On July 20, 1821, William Cox Ellis (F) from  resigned.  A special election was held to fill the resulting vacancy on October 9, 1821.

Election results

Murray took his seat on December 12, 1821.

See also
List of special elections to the United States House of Representatives

References

Pennsylvania 1821 10
Pennsylvania 1821 10
1821 10
Pennsylvania 10
United States House of Representatives 10
United States House of Representatives 1821 10